Cleveland Style is an album led by American trombonist Jimmy Cleveland featuring tracks recorded in 1957. It was released on the EmArcy label.

Reception

The Allmusic review stated " it is not surprising that the result is high-quality straightahead jazz. Worth searching for".

Track listing
 "Out of This World" (Harold Arlen, Johnny Mercer) - 4:11 
 "All This and Heaven Too" (Jimmy Van Heusen, Eddie DeLange) - 5:49
 "Posterity" (Trevor Duncan) - 4:52
 "Long Ago (and Far Away)" (Jerome Kern, Ira Gershwin) - 3:28
 "A Jazz Ballad" (Ernie Wilkins) - 4:11
 "Jimmie's Tune" (Jimmy Cleveland) - 3:40
 "Goodbye Ebbets Field" (Wilkins) - 6:10

Personnel 
Jimmy Cleveland - trombone
Art Farmer - trumpet
Don Butterfield (tracks 1, 4 & 7), Jimmy McAllister (tracks 2, 3 5 & 6) - tuba
Benny Golson - tenor saxophone
Wynton Kelly - piano
Eddie Jones - bass
Charlie Persip - drums
Ernie Wilkins - arranger, conductor

References 

1958 albums
Jimmy Cleveland albums
EmArcy Records albums
Albums arranged by Ernie Wilkins